Farahabad was a large-scale palace complex located outside the city wall of Isfahan. It was constructed under the orders of the Safavid shah Soltan Hoseyn during the later part of his reign. It was razed by the Afghans in 1727, the same year that Soltan Hoseyn died.

References

Sources 
 
 
 

Buildings and structures in Isfahan
Safavid architecture